Syed Kamrul Islam Mohammad Salehuddin (died 1983) was a Bangladeshi politician. He served as member of parliament for Faridpur-3 from 1973 to 1979.

Career 
Salehuddin stood for the National Assembly of Pakistan as an Awami League candidate in the 1970 Pakistani general election. He was elected for Faridpur-II by a large margin over three opponents, including Pakistan Democratic Party candidate Abdus Salam Khan.

Salehuddin was elected to the Bangladesh Parliament in 1973 from Faridpur-3.

Death 
Salehuddin died on 24 May 1983 at PG Hospital in Dhaka. He is buried at Banani Graveyard in Dhaka, Bangladesh.a private Technical College under Bangladesh Technical Education Board named Barrister Syed Kamrul Islam Mohammad Salehuddin Technical College established in 2019 at Bonomalidia,Madhukhali under Faridpur district

References

Independent politicians in Bangladesh
1983 deaths
1st Jatiya Sangsad members